Fife Flyers is the oldest professional ice hockey club in the UK, established in 1938. The Flyers play their home games at Fife Ice Arena in Kirkcaldy which has a capacity of just over 3000 (seated and standing).

They joined the EIHL in 2011. Fife's head coach is Canadian Todd Dutiaume who has been assisted by Jeff Hutchins since the 2016–17 season.

History

Early years (1938–1980)

Fife Flyers' first game was on 1 October 1938 versus Dundee Tigers, with the first goal scored by Norman McQuade and thethe first club captain being Les Lovell Snr.

The Flyers won the Scottish element of the Autumn Cup for the first time in 1948, felling Falkirk Lions in the Final. They were runners-up in their attempt to defend the title in a year where they also won the Scottish National League (SNL) for the first time. Fife won the Scottish Autumn Cup back in 1950, this time against the Ayr Raiders, which formed a Double as they retained the SNL title. In 1954 Fife joined the British National League, and in its maiden campaign finished ninth in the eleven-strong division. The League was reduced from eleven to five after all but one–the Paisley Pirates–of the Scottish contingent pulled out.

In 1972 Fife won the Northern Autumn Cup–reconstituted as a regional tournament in 1967–before lifting it three more timesthat decade. They would also achieve success in league action, winning the Northern League two seasons running. The Flyers also played in the one-season Scottish National League in 1981–82, finishing third.

British Hockey League years (1982–1996)
Fife joined the new British Hockey League (BHL) in 1982. In the 1984–85 BHL season, the Flyers won the Scottish section of the now-national Autumn Cup, before losing the Final at Streatham Ice Rink against Durham Wasps. The Wasps also pipped Fife to the regular season championship, but the playoffs were won by Fife, who beat fellow Scots the Murrayfield Racers in the final. The Racers' revenge came in the playoff semi-finals the following season. Fife Flyers were beaten Autumn Cup finalists again in 1986–87, losing to the Nottingham Panthers at the National Exhibition Centre, and there was no silverware in the playoffs either as Durham Wasps defeated Fife, as they did in the following season. The 1988–89 BHL season saw Fife Flyers fail to graduate from their playoff group, sparking a barren run which would take in semi-final defeat to Welsh club Cardiff Devils in 1989–90, a finish of dead last the year after, and a season outside the top-flight; reaching the BHL final four for the final time in the 1993–94 BHL season.

The final BHL season was 1995–96, after which time the Ice Hockey Superleague became the new top British league.

Back in the British National League (1996–2005)

The Flyers joined the new second tier British National League (BNL) in 1996. The BNL featured a Premier League and a Northern Premier League in the début season. Fife finished top of the Northern Premier League's first round, before winning the playoffs. They lost the Inter-League Final to the Swindon IceLords, however Ice Hockey Journalists UK (IHJUK) awarded both the Coach of the Year Trophy and Player of the Year Trophy to Mark Morrison. The second season saw the conferences of five teams renamed to Northern and Southern Pools, and again Fife came top of their region. In the National Pool they finished sixth out of nine (the Cardiff Devils' second side were excluded from the National Pool), with all ten teams in the end-of-season events. Having won Group B to be Scotland's only survivors, the Flyers were downed in the semi-finals by Hullite club Kingston Hawks.

The BNL did away with regional conferences for 1998–99, and Fife Flyers finished fifth in the first round, with Slough Jets top of the nine-strong league. With only bottom club Paisley Pirates failing to make the playoffs, both the Flyers and the Jets qualified from Group A, and both won their semi-final (against Guildford Flames and Basingstoke Bison respectively) to face each other in the Final, which was won by the Scottish club, giving them their first BNL title. Defending their title in 1999–2000, the Flyers finished first both in the regular season and their playoff group before winning the semi-final, and the Final itself, against Basingstoke Bison.

Searching for a three-peat in 2000–01, the Flyers delivered their worst BNL performance yet, failing to reach the semi-finals for the first time at this level. Flyers posted a semi-final finish in three of the following four campaigns: beaten by Dundee Stars in 2001–02, by the Bracknell Bees in 2003–04 and in 2004–05 (the last BNL season), the Flyers fell to the Flames, after only last-placed Edinburgh Capitals failed to qualify for the playoffs.

After the Edinburgh Capitals and Newcastle Vipers joined the top-flight Elite Ice Hockey League (the Superleague having ceased operations in 2003), the BNL folded, with all the former BNL clubs joining other leagues.

Silverware in Scotland: British, Caledonian, and Celtic competitions (2005–2011)

The Flyers' next destinations were the resurrected Northern League and the third iteration of the SNL. They were very successful in their first season at these levels, winning both Leagues, their respective playoffs, the Scottish Cup, and the Scottish Autumn Cup. These comprised a Grand Slam. The following season, the John Brady Bowl–awarded to Northern League playoff champions–was the only trophy to have eluded them.

Leaving the SNL but remaining in the Northern League, Fife were founder members of the five-team Scottish Premier Hockey League  in 2007. They extended their dominance to this new division; since Fife Flyers entry in to the Scottish Premier, they have won 11 out of 12 trophies while recording a new club record of 47 consecutive wins and a 50-game unbeaten run, from September 2006 to April 2007, while again winning the regular season and the playoffs in both set-ups. Flyers entered the Celtic League Cup for its inaugural competition in 2008–09, a league composed of six clubs, two from Ireland and four from Scotland. They finished top of the league, and won the four-team playoffs, as well as winning the Northern League, Scottish Cup, and Scottish Autumn Cup. A more modest season was to follow as their haul in 2009–10 featured the Scottish Cup and the final Celtic League Cup, before their final season in the Northern League ended with Fife first.

Flying high: Fife in the Elite League (2011–present)
In late June 2011, the Fife Flyers were accepted into the EIHL, replacing the Newcastle Vipers for the 2011–12 season. The Flyers found the going tough in their first season back in Britain's top flight ice hockey league, finishing in last place and missing the play-offs entirely. With a year of top-flight experience, the Flyers' second season (2012–13) was moderately more successful. The team, led by key players Casey Haines, Derek Keller, and Bryan Pitton, won at home, but struggled to win games away from Kirkcaldy. They finished seventh in the league, resulting in an eighth position seeding for the play-offs (Hull Stingrays, despite finishing 8th in the league, had won their conference and were consequently seeded second overall as conference winners). Fife played Nottingham Panthers over two hotly contested legs, winning 4–2 at home before losing 3–0 in Nottingham and being eliminated from the play-offs.

In the 2013–14 season, a squad overhaul meant that only two foreign players, Bobby Chaumount and Danny Stewart, returned from the previous year. After a poor start to the season continued through the winter, changes were made in February, and an ensuing successful run saw them qualify for the play-offs in the last game of the season. They defeated the Gardiner Conference champion Dundee Stars 8–4 on aggregate and made the final four play-off finals in Nottingham. Their semi-final game against the league winning Belfast Giants was hotly contested, but the Giants emerged 1-0 winners.

While many players from the semi-final team returned for the 2014–15 season, the team saw mixed results. The Flyers qualified for the quarter-finals of the Challenge Cup and for the play-offs, but did not progress to the finals. With only Danny Stewart and Kyle Haines returning as foreign players for 2015–16, the squad underwent a major overhaul. The Flyers finished 6th in the league and 2nd in their conference, losing to Braehead Clan on equal points. Fife drew the Clan in the quarter-finals and won a close victory (2-1 at home, 2–2 away after overtime). Their semi-final game against Nottingham Panthers was less successful, with Fife losing by a score of 4–1.

Fife Flyers won the Gardiner Conference for the 2017–18 season with an away win over Dundee Stars securing the title. In the 2017–18 season they finished 7th. Fife Flyers were among the early pacesetters in the race for the 2018–19 title, after their positive start to the season, but they finished in 6th in the standings.

The 2019–20 season proved to be their worst on-ice performance since their inaugural season in the league in 2011–12, with the Flyers bottom of the table in 10th at the time of the league's cancellation, due to the coronavirus pandemic, in March 2020.

In July 2021, the Flyers confirmed their intention to return to Elite League action for the 2021–22 season, following the cancellation of the 2020-21 campaign. The club also confirmed the return behind the bench of head coach Todd Dutiaume and assistant coach Jeff Hutchins.

The 2021-22 Elite League campaign resulted in a finish bottom of the standings (10th) and saw Fife miss the play-offs by 14 points. In June 2022, the Flyers once again announced the return of head coach Todd Dutiaume, who also took on General Manager responsibilities. Assistant coach Jeff Hutchins was named an associate coach with a greater say in the day-to-day running of the team.

On 15 February 2023, Fife reached the final of the Challenge Cup for the very first time, with a 7-6 aggregate win (after the shootout) against the Sheffield Steelers. The final saw Fife take on the Belfast Giants. However, the Flyers would lose 9-3 at a sold out SSE Arena on 1 March to the hosts Belfast, who claimed their fourth Challenge Cup title in five seasons.

Elite Ice Hockey League record

† Note the 2019–20 season was cancelled in March 2020, with Fife having played 49 games, due to the Coronavirus pandemic. The league and play-offs finished without a winner and the above stat line reflects the Flyers' position at the time of the cancellation.

†† Note: The 2020–21 Elite League season - originally scheduled for a revised start date of 5 December - was suspended on 15 September 2020, because of ongoing coronavirus pandemic restrictions. The EIHL board determined that the season was non-viable without supporters being permitted to attend matches and unanimously agreed to a suspension. The season was cancelled completely in February 2021.

Current squad 
Squad for 2022-23 Elite League season 

* Denotes two-way deal with Solway Sharks of the NIHL 1

Retired jersey numbers 
16  Gordon Latto, the team's longest serving player who started playing with Fife Flyers in 1972 and retired in 1998, recording 974 games with a total of 1,265 points.
17  Mark Morrison
47  Frank Morris
14 – Was considered unlucky and taken out of circulation following a serious eye injury to the British forward Andy Linton and a career-ending injury to the Canadian defenceman Calvert Brown, but has been re-introduced in recent years.

Player records 
All time statistics
 Most games played: 974 – Gordon Latto (Snr): (1972–1998)
 Most points: 1265 – Gordon Latto (Snr): (1972–1998)
 Most goals all time: 393 – Mark Morrison (1993–2005)

Season records
 Most goals in a season: 108 – Dave Stoyanovich (1984–85)
 Most assists in a season: 117 – Dave Stoyanovich (1986–87)
 Most points in a season: 211 – Richard LaPlante (1991–92); 189 –  Mark Morrison (1993–94); 188 – Bud Scrutton (1948–49); 185 – Dave Stoyanovich (1984–85) & Chick Mann (1948–49)
 Most powerplay goals in a season: 38 – Russell Monteith (1999–00)
 Most shorthanded goals in a season: 13 – Doug Smail (1993–94)
 Most shut-outs in a season: 7 – Blair Daly (2006–07); 5 – Roy Reid (1964–65)

Game records (all players)
 Fastest goal in 1 game: 6 seconds – Les Lovell (1975)
 Most goals in 1 game: 13 – Dave Stoyanovich (1984)
 Most assists in 1 game: 13 – Steve Moria (1987)
 Most points in 1 game: 17 – Richard LaPlante (1991)

Game records (home based players) 
 Most goals in 1 game: 8 – Jimmy Spence (1964); 7 – Les Lovell (1976) & John Haig (1997)
 Most assists in 1 game: 9 – Gordon Latto(Snr) (1977) & Ally Brennan (1976)
 Most points in 1 game: 11 – Gordon Latto(Snr), John Taylor & Les Lovell (all 1977) 10 – John Haig & Steven King (1997) 9 – Chic Cottrell (1974)

BIHWA Hall of Fame inductees 
 Floyd Snider (1951)
 Jack Dryburgh (1991)
 Lawrie Lovell (1992)
 Gordon Latto (1999)
 Jim Lynch (2001)

All Star honours 
Player of the Year Trophy
  Les Lovell 1970–71
  Ally Brennan 1972–73
  Gordon Latto 1976–77, 1977–78, 1978–79
  Dave Stoyanovich 1984–85
  Doug Smail 1993–94
  Mark Morrison 1996–97, 1997–98
  Stephen Murphy 1999–00

Coach of the Year Trophy
  Al Rodgers 1946–47, 1947–48, 1949–50
  Lawrie Lovell  1975–76
  Ron Plumb 1984–85
  Brian Kanewischer 1990–91
  Mark Morrison 1996–97, 1997–98, 1999–00, 2003–04

Player's Player of the Year
  Mark Morrison 1997–98
  Stephen Murphy 1999–00

Netminder of the Year
  Stephen Murphy 1999–00

Ahearne Medal
  Gordon Latto 1998

Rookie of the Year
  Chic Cottrell 1970–71

Young Player of the Year
  Iain Robertson 1989–90

EIHL All Stars 
Second Team 
  Derek Keller 2012–13
  Shane Owen 2016–17

Notable former players 
  Ron Plumb
  Vincent Lukáč
  Doug Smail
  Laurie Boschman
  Jimmy Chappell
  Al Sims
  Mark Morrison

Honours 
 Celtic League Playoffs: 2008–09, 2009–10
 Celtic League Cup: 2008–09, 2009–10
 British National League: 1999–00, 2003–04
 Grand Slam: 1977, 1999–00, 2005–06, 2006–07
 British Champions: 1976–77, 1977–78, 1984–85, 1998–99, 1999–00
 Scottish Premier Hockey League Champions: 2007–08
 Scottish Premier League Play-off: 2007–08
 Northern League Play-off: 2007–08, 2008–09, 2010–11
 Northern League Champions: 1976–77, 1977–78, 1996–97, 1997–98, 2005–06, 2006–07, 2007–08, 2010–11
 Autumn Cup: 1949–50, 1972, 1975, 1976, 2005, 2008
 Scottish League: 1939–40, 1948–49, 1949–50, 1963–64, 1990–91, 1995–96, 2005–06, 2006–07
 Scottish Cup: 1984–85, 1993–94, 1994–95, 1997–98, 1998–99, 1999–00, 2000–01, 2005–06, 2006–07, 2008–09, 2009–10
Challenge Cup runners-up 2022–23

References

External links 
 Fife Flyers team web page

Ice hockey clubs established in 1938
Ice hockey teams in Scotland
Sport in Fife
Elite Ice Hockey League teams
1938 establishments in Scotland
Kirkcaldy